Sandra Sade-Moshonov is an Israeli film, television and theater actress.

Biography 
Sandra Sade was born in Romania. She is married to Israeli actor Moni Moshonov, with whom she has two children.

Acting and film career 
Sade performed for about 17 years at the Cameri Theater. She also played at the Beit Lessin Theater.

In 1981, Sade participated in the educational television program, Homeland. She also participated in the drama, Poker Face, from the Homeland Lesson series, and had a guest role in the comedy series, Krovim Krovim.

Sade has appeared in several films. In 1988, she had a secondary role (Alice Alexandrovich) in Eli Cohen 's film based on a script by Gila Almagor, Aviya's Summer. In 2001, she appeared in Six Million Shreds; in 2004, she starred in Arie by Roman Kachanov, as well as in The Secret of Chocolate, alongside Hanan Goldblatt; and in 2006, she played Hannah alongside Yisrael Poliakov in Daniel Syrkin's film, Apparently. In 2007, she appeared in the movie, מתוק ומר, in the role of a fortune teller.

In 2010, she participated in the TV series, Arab Labor, playing the role of Yocheved. Starting in 2011, she played Rivka (Ricky) Rosen in the comedy series, Savri Maranan. In both series she embodied a stereotypical Polish mother.

In 2012, she guest-starred in the series, Rest, and in 2014, she appeared in the series, Yellow Peppers. From that year, she performed in the Cameri Theater in the play, The New Criminals, by Edna Mazya. From 2016, she played (alternately with Hanna Laslow) the role of Bertha in Fleischer, a play by Yigal Even Or in the stage theater. That year she translated the play, Shirley Valentine, by Willie Russell for Theater Show.

In 2017, she appeared in the film, The Cakemaker. Also in 2017, she commenced a role as the older Naomi Shemer (alternately with Gila Almagor) in the musical, Biography of Naomi Shemer. In 2019, she began acting in the musical, Givat Halfon Doesn't Answer, at the Habima Theater. Beginning in August 2019, she played  with Yona Elian in Things I Know at the Beit Lessin Theater in collaboration with Haifa Theatre.

In 2021, she took part in the second season of the Israeli production of The Masked Singer as the Strawberry, and was the fourth contestant eliminated.

Filmography
 The Cakemaker (2017)
 Maasiya Urbanit (2012)
 Savri Maranan (2011) Rivka «Riki» Rosen
 Arab Labor (2007) Yocheved
 Lemarit Ain (2006) Hana
 Things Behind the Sun (2006) Smadi
 Yamim Kfuim (2005) Neighbor
 Poker Face (2002) Anna
 Shisha Million Resisim (2001)
 Etz Hadomim Tafus (1994) Aunt Alice, voice acting
 Aviya's Summer (1988) Aunt Alice
 Krovim Krovim (1982) Bruria
 Cyrilson Retires

See also
Theater of Israel
Women in Israel

References 

Living people
Romanian Jews
Jewish Israeli actresses
Israeli people of Romanian-Jewish descent
Romanian emigrants to Israel
Israeli stage actresses
Israeli television actresses
Israeli film actresses
20th-century Israeli actresses
21st-century Israeli actresses
1949 births